The County of Jervois is a cadastral unit in the Australian state of South Australia that covers land on the east coast of the Eyre Peninsula. It was proclaimed on 24 January 1878 and named after William Jervois, the Governor of South Australia from October 1877 to January 1883.

Description 
It is bounded by the counties of Le Hunte, Buxton and York to the north (from west to east), by the County of Musgrave to the west and by the County of Flinders to the south.

The county includes the towns of Cowell, Arno Bay, Port Neill, Darke Peak, and Rudall.

The Lincoln Highway passes along the coastline of the county from the north-east to the south-west, and the Birdseye Highway passes through the county in an east-west direction from Cowell in the east to Lock in the adjoining county of Musgrave.

The Cummins to Kimba line of the Eyre Peninsula Railway passes through the county, entering at its south-west corner, passing through the hundreds of Brooker and Moody in an east-west direction, before changing to a south-north alignment that passes through the hundreds of Butler, Verran, Rudall, Smeaton and Pascoe.

The principal land use is primary industry, which is represented by broadacre farming of wheat and livestock, the mining of jade, and aquaculture at Arno Bay and in Franklin Harbor on the coast of Spencer Gulf. Other protected areas within the county include the following conservation parks - Carappee Hill, Darke Range, Franklin Harbor, Heggaton, Middlecamp Hills, Moody Tank, Munyaroo, Rudall, Sheoak Hill, The Plug Range, Verran Tanks, Wharminda, and Yeldulknie.

The county incorporates the eastern part of the District Council of Elliston in the west, the District Council of Cleve in its centre, the District Council of Franklin Harbour on the coastline with Spencer Gulf, and the northern part of the District Council of Tumby Bay in the south.

The county was named after Governor Jervois, the Governor of South Australia at the time the country was proclaimed, in accordance with “a precedent which was established in 1842" when a county was named after Governor Gawler.

Constituent hundreds

Location of hundreds
The county comprises 34 hundreds. The hundreds are laid out from east to west in five rows (from north to south) as follows:
McGregor, Charleston, Glynn, James, Heggaton, Jamieson, Pascoe, Darke and Hambidge in the north-west corner of the county separated by an area of land that has not been proclaimed as one or more hundreds, all along the northern boundary of the county,
Warren, Minbrie, Miltalie, Mangalo, Campoona, Smeaton, Boonerdo and Palkagee,
Wilton, Playford, Hawker, Mann, Yadnarie, Rudall, Murlong and the northern half of Tooligie at the western boundary of the county,
Boothby, Roberts, Verran, a parcel of land consisting of Hincks and land not proclaimed as a hundred, and a parcel of land consisting of the southern half of Tooligie and Nicholls at the western boundary of the county, and
Dixson, Butler, Moody and Brooker along the southern boundary of the county.

Hundred of Boonerdo
The Hundred of Boonerdo was proclaimed on 28 June 1928.

Hundred of Boothby
The Hundred of Boothby was proclaimed on 24 January 1878. Its northern end is within the locality of Cleve while its southern end is in the locality of Arno Bay.

Hundred of Brooker
The Hundred of Brooker was proclaimed on 26 November 1903. It is located entirely within the locality of Brooker.

Hundred of Butler
The Hundred of Butler was proclaimed on 25 April 1895. It is located mainly within the locality of Butler while its south-west corner is located in the locality of Ungarra.

Hundred of Campoona
The Hundred of Campoona was proclaimed on 25 April 1895. It is located entirely within the locality of  Campoona.

Hundred of Charleston
The Hundred of Charleston was proclaimed on 12 December 1895. It is located entirely within the locality of Midgee.

Hundred of Darke
The Hundred of Darke was proclaimed on 3 February 1910. Most of it is located within the locality of Darke Peak with its north-eastern corner being located in the locality of Waddikee.

Hundred of Dixson
The Hundred of Dixson was proclaimed on 26 November 1903. It is located entirely within the locality of Port Neill.

Hundred of Glynn
The Hundred of Glynn was proclaimed on 12 December 1895. It located entirely within the locality of Minbrie.

Hundred of Hambidge
The Hundred of Hambidge was proclaimed on 31 October 1957.  It was named after Clive M. Hambidge, a former Surveyor General of South Australia.  It is located mainly in the locality of  Hambidge with its south-west corner being located in  Ulyerra.

Hundred of Hawker

The Hundred of Hawker was proclaimed on 24 January 1878. It is located almost entirely within the locality of Cowell with a portion on the Spencer Gulf coastline being in the locality of Port Gibbon.

Hundred of Heggaton
The Hundred of Heggaton was proclaimed on 3 February 1910. It is located entirely within the locality of Mangalo.

Hundred of Hincks
The Hundred of Hincks was proclaimed on 31 October 1957.  It was named after Cecil Hincks, a former member of the South Australian Parliament.  It is mainly located within the locality of Hincks with its north-west corner being located in the locality of Murlong.

Hundred of James
The Hundred of James was proclaimed on 3 February 1910. It is located entirely within the locality of Miltalie.

Hundred of Jamieson
The Hundred of Jamieson was proclaimed on 3 February 1910. Its northern side is located within the locality of Waddikee while its southern side is in the locality of Jamieson.

Hundred of Mangalo
The Hundred of Mangalo was proclaimed on 24 January 1878. It is located entirely within the locality of Mangalo.

Hundred of Mann
The Hundred of Mann was proclaimed on 24 January 1878. It is located entirely within the locality of Cleve.

Hundred of McGregor
The Hundred of McGregor was proclaimed on 12 December 1895. It is located fully within the locality of Midgee.

Hundred of Miltalie
The Hundred of Miltalie was proclaimed on 24 January 1878. It is located entirely within the locality of Miltalie.

Hundred of Minbrie
The Hundred of Minbrie was proclaimed on 24 January 1878. It located almost entirely within the locality of Minbrie with exception to an intrusion of part of Miltalie on its west side.

Hundred of Moody
The Hundred of Moody was proclaimed on 15 January 1903. Its northern end is located within the locality of Moody while its southern end is in the locality of Ungarra.

Hundred of Murlong
The Hundred of Murlong was proclaimed on 28 June 1928.

Hundred of Nicholls
The Hundred of Nicholls was proclaimed on 4 October 1928. Its northern end is located within the locality of Hincks while its south is in the locality of Brooker.

Hundred of Palkagee
The Hundred of Palkagee was proclaimed on 1 October 1914. It is entirely located within the locality of Lock.

Hundred of Pascoe
The Hundred of Pascoe was proclaimed on 3 February 1910. Its northern end is located in the locality of  Waddikee while its southern end is in the locality of Darke Peak.

Hundred of Playford
The Hundred of Playford was proclaimed on 24 January 1878.  It was named after  Thomas Playford, a former member of the South Australian Parliament and the first parliamentarian with that name.  It located almost entirely within the locality of  Cowell and includes the full extent of the embayment known as Franklin Harbor.

Hundred of Roberts
The Hundred of Roberts was proclaimed on 5 September 1907. Most of it is located within the locality of Verran while its northern edge being in Cleve and Rudall.

Hundred of Rudall
The Hundred of Rudall was proclaimed on 3 February 1910. It is located entirely within the locality of Rudall.

Hundred of Smeaton
The Hundred of Smeaton was proclaimed on 3/02/1910. It is located entirely within the locality of Kielpa.

Hundred of Tooligie
The Hundred of Tooligie was proclaimed on 3 August 1916.

Hundred of Verran
The Hundred of Verran was proclaimed on 17 September 1908. It is located within the following localities from north to south - Rudall, Verran and  Wharminda.

Hundred of Warren
The Hundred of Warren was proclaimed on 12 December 1895. It is located mainly within the locality of  Mitchellville whiles its north-west and north-east corners are located within Midgee.

Hundred of Wilton
The Hundred of Wilton was proclaimed on 18 March 1897. It is located almost entirely within the locality of Mitchellville with exception to its south-west corner which is in the locality of Lucky Bay.

Hundred of Yadnarie
The Hundred of Yadnarie was proclaimed on 24 January 1878. It is located mainly in the locality of Cleve while its western edge is located in the localities of Rudall and  Campoona.

The Yadnarie School opened in 1913 and closed in 1948.

See also
Lands administrative divisions of South Australia
Jervois (disambiguation)

References

Jervois
Jervois